Kutz-Bauer v Freie und Hansestadt Hamburg [2003] ECR I-02741 (2002) C-187/00 is an EU labour law case, which held that in justifying discrimination, budgetary considerations alone cannot be decisive.

Facts
Germany had a scheme, that it argued combated unemployment. Any employee who was recruited from unemployment and over the age of 55 could receive 70% of their wage if they worked part-time. The government would make up any shortfall compared to the wage of the employer. Part timers could also opt to condense their work into a full-time job, but have their pay spread over till retirement. Frau Kutz Bauer was age 60 and wanted to work two and a half years, and then retire. However, she was 60, and already eligible for the German state pension. Because of this she was ineligible for the part-time work scheme. She argued that only men could benefit between ages 60 and 65 and therefore the scheme breached the Directive.

Judgment
ECJ said it was up to member states to choose ‘aims which they pursue in employment matters. The Court has recognised that the Member States have a broad margin of discretion in exercising that power…’ (C-167/97 Seymour-Smith and Perez [1999] ECR I-623, para 74) and the encouragement of recruitment is a legitimate aim.

And the City of Hamburg, as a public body, cannot justify discrimination from a scheme of part-time work on grounds of increased costs.

See also

Notes

Court of Justice of the European Union case law
Anti-discrimination law
2003 in the European Union
Sexism
German labour law
Hamburg law
German case law
2003 in case law
2003 in Germany
European Union labour case law
2000s in Hamburg